Michael Rupert Rosswess (born 11 June 1965 in Dudley, Worcestershire - now West Midlands) is a retired English sprinter.

Rosswess reached the final of the 200 metres event at the 1988 Olympic Games in Seoul, where he finished in seventh place. In 1991, he reached the semi-finals of the 200 metres at the World Championships.

Rosswess was a bronze medalist in the 60 metres sprint at the European Athletics Indoor Championships on three occasions (in 1989, 1992 and 1994). His personal best time for the event was 6.58 seconds (set in 1989).

Outdoors, Rosswess' personal best times were 10.07 seconds for 100 metres (set in 1994), and 20.51 seconds for 200 metres (set in 1988).

International competitions

References

sports-reference

1965 births
Living people
Sportspeople from Dudley
British male sprinters
English male sprinters
Olympic athletes of Great Britain
Athletes (track and field) at the 1988 Summer Olympics
World Athletics Championships athletes for Great Britain